Carwai Seto (born 2 April 1973) is a Canadian breaststroke, freestyle and medley swimmer who represented Taiwan in international competition. She competed in five events at the 1988 Summer Olympics.

Olympic swimming
Seto was born and raised in Halifax, Nova Scotia. Her mother is Taiwanese, which made her eligible to compete for Taiwan. Her swimming coach was fellow Nova Scotian Gary MacDonald. 

She held the Taiwanese record of 2:38.93 in the 200 m breaststroke from 1989 until 2004, when it was broken by Lin Man-hsu. 

She later set the Taiwanese record of 1:13.33 in the 100 m breaststroke at the 1991 Pan Pacific Swimming Championships, which stood until 2005 when it was broken by Tong Yu-chia.

Subsequent career
Seto entered Princeton University in 1991. She subsequently received a Master of Education from Lesley University in Massachusetts, and taught math and science at various elementary and schools in Massachusetts, Maryland, and California. In 2013, she joined the faculty of Black Pine Circle (Upper) School in Berkeley, California where she teaches math.

References

External links
 
Photo of Seto training for the 1988 Summer Olympics, by Central News Agency, via Ministry of Culture

1973 births
Living people
Canadian female swimmers
Taiwanese female breaststroke swimmers
Taiwanese female freestyle swimmers
Taiwanese female medley swimmers
Olympic swimmers of Taiwan
Swimmers at the 1988 Summer Olympics
Sportspeople from Halifax, Nova Scotia
Canadian people of Taiwanese descent
Princeton University alumni